"Cry for Help" is a song by British dance-pop singer Rick Astley, released as the first single from his third studio album, Free (1991). It was written by Astley and Rob Fisher, formerly one half of the 1980s pop outfits Naked Eyes and Climie Fisher. The Andraé Crouch Choir provided backing vocals. The song is a ballad, unlike Astley's other more dance-oriented hit singles such as "Never Gonna Give You Up" (1987). 

Released as a single on 14 January 1991, "Cry for Help" reached number seven on both the UK Singles Chart and the US Billboard Hot 100, becoming Astley's last top-10 hit in either country. It also reached number four in Canada and was a number-one hit on both the US and Canadian Adult Contemporary charts. The song's number-seven UK chart placing meant that Astley became the first male solo artist to have his first eight singles reach the British top 10. Its accompanying music video received heavy rotation on MTV Europe.

The song has been sung by Rick Astley in duet with Søren Sko and covered by Thomas Anders (ex-Modern Talking). In 2019, Astley recorded and released a "Reimagined" version of the song for his album The Best of Me. On 27 April 2021, the original music video was upgraded to 1080p HD to celebrate 30 years of the song reaching number seven on the Billboard Hot 100.

Critical reception
Dave Obee from  Calgary Herald felt the "finest moments" on the song come from Andrae Crouch's choir arrangement, adding that it's what makes "Cry for Help" "worth hearing". Eleanor Levy from Record Mirror described it as "a Michael McDonald style ballad that, rather than shocking the world, cuddles it instead."

Track listings
 12-inch single
 "Cry for Help" – 6:26
 "Behind The Smile" – 4:33
 "Cry for Help" (Album version) – 4:50

 CD single
 "Cry for Help" (7" version) – 4:20
 "Behind The Smile" – 4:37
 "Cry for Help" (12" version) – 6:27

 7-inch and cassette single
 "Cry for Help" (Edit) – 4:03
 "Behind The Smile" – 4:33

Personnel 
 Rick Astley – lead vocals 
 Dave West – acoustic piano, Fender Rhodes, organ, synthesizers 
 Hywel Maggs – guitars 
 Vinnie Colaiuta – drums 
 Anne Dudley – string arrangements and conductor 
 The Andraé Crouch Choir – backing vocals

Charts

Weekly charts

Year-end charts

References

External links
 http://www.discogs.com/release/836168

1991 songs
1991 singles
1990s ballads
RCA Records singles
Rick Astley songs
Songs written by Rick Astley
Songs written by Rob Fisher (British musician)